Theater of Dimensions is the seventh studio album by German symphonic metal band, Xandria. The album was released on January 27, 2017.

This is the second and final studio album to feature vocalist Dianne van Giersbergen and bassist Steven Wussow, as well as the final studio album to feature guitarist Philip Restemeier and drummer Gerit Lamm.

Track listing

Personnel
All information from the album booklet.

Xandria
 Dianne van Giersbergen – lead vocals
 Marco Heubaum – guitars, co-producer
 Philip Restemeier – guitars
 Steven Wussow – bass
 Gerit Lamm – drums

Additional musicians
 Henning Basse – vocals on "A Theater of Dimensions"
 Björn Strid – vocals on "We Are Murderers (We All)"
 Ross Thompson – vocals on "Ship of Doom"
 Zaher Zorgati – vocals on "Burn Me"
 Valerio Recenti – backing vocals
 Ben Mathot – violin
 David Faber – cello
 Johannes Schiefner – uilleann pipes
 Jeroen Goossens – whistles
 PA'dam Chamber Choir – choir

Choir
 Maria van Nieukerken – choir conductor
 Annette Vermeulen, Cécile Roovers, Karen Langendonk, Sabine van der Heijden, Andreas Goetze, Angus van Grevenbroek, Jan Douwes, Job Hubatka, Alfrun Schmid, Annemieke Nuijten, Frederique Klooster, Ruth Becker, Daan Verlaan, Dierderik Rooker, Leon van Liere, René Veen

Production
 Joost van den Broek – producer, recording, mixing, keyboards, narration on "A Theater of Dimensions"
 Jos Driessen – engineering
 Stefan Heilemann – photography, artwork, layout
 Darius van Helfteren – mastering

Charts

References

2017 albums
Napalm Records albums
Xandria albums